Glenn Jerry van Dijken (born September 6, 1962)  is a Canadian politician who was elected in the 2019 Alberta general election to represent the electoral district of Athabasca-Barrhead-Westlock in the 30th Alberta Legislature.

Electoral history

References

Wildrose Party MLAs
Living people
1960s births
21st-century Canadian politicians
Farmers from Alberta
United Conservative Party MLAs